Sergi Bruguera defeated Cédric Pioline in the final, 7–6(7–2), 6–0 to win the singles tennis title at the 1993 Monte Carlo Open.

Thomas Muster was the defending champion, but lost in the semifinals to Bruguera.

Seeds

Draw

Finals

Section 1

Section 2

Section 3

Section 4

External links
 ATP singles draw

Singles